Plateros de Fresnillo (English: Fresnillo Silversmiths) is a professional Mexican basketball team, based in Fresnillo. The Plateros are part Liga Nacional de Baloncesto Profesional, the top professional basketball league in Mexico. The team play their home games at the Gimnasio Solidaridad Municipal, with a capacity of 4,000 spectators.

History
The Plateros were founded in 2019 in order to compete in the 2019–20 LNBP season. The team was created by an initiative of the local government of Fresnillo and the state government of Zacatecas in order to promote basketball in the region. Initially, all the investment was made by the State of Zacatecas government, with an estimate amount of 13 million pesos (around US$560,000).

Plateros joined the three other new teams for the 2019–20: the Astros de Jalisco and the Dorados de Chihuahua.

Players

Current roster

 

}

Notable players
Diamon Simpson (born 1987)

References

External links
 Team profile 

Basketball teams in Mexico
Sport in Zacatecas
Basketball teams established in 2019
2019 establishments in Mexico